The Nebel is a river in Mecklenburg-Vorpommern, Germany. It is a 60 km long right tributary of the Warnow. It flows through Krakow am See and Güstrow, and joins the Warnow in Bützow.

Rivers of Mecklenburg-Western Pomerania
Rivers of Germany